Shuva is a religious moshav in southern Israel. Located near Netivot and covering 4,500 dunams, it falls under the jurisdiction of Sdot Negev Regional Council.

History
The village was established in 1950 by Jewish immigrants and refugees from Tripoli (in modern Libya). They were later joined by more Jewish immigrants from Algeria and Tunisia. However, this created tensions between the residents, and in 1957 the moshav split in two, with the Tunisian residents leaving to form Zimrat.

Its name was taken from Psalms 126:4;
Turn our captivity, O LORD, as the streams in the dry land.

References

External links
Shuva Negev Information Centre

Moshavim
Religious Israeli communities
Populated places established in 1950
Gaza envelope
Populated places in Southern District (Israel)
1950 establishments in Israel
Algerian-Jewish culture in Israel
Libyan-Jewish culture in Israel
Tunisian-Jewish culture in Israel